eToys.com was a retail website that sold toys via the Internet. It was established by a startup company of the same name on November 3, 1997. After an initial public offering on January 4, 1999, the company quickly shot up in value, becoming emblematic of the dot-com bubble. The company went bankrupt on April 1, 2001, and shut down soon thereafter. The etoys.com domain went through a number of changes of ownership afterwards, and has been owned by Toys "R" Us since February 2009.

History
eToys was launched on November 3, 1997, as an Idealab company. In 1999, eToys held an IPO. Shares were issued at $20. At the end of the first day of trading, the stock closed at $76 a share. eMarketer was once quoted as saying; "Put simply, eToys is the benchmark against which all other toy sites are measured". In 1999, the company was involved in a high-profile dispute with Swiss art site etoy. EToys attempted to seize the etoy.com domain from etoy on the grounds that it was confusingly similar to its own domain, but it relented after widespread Internet outrage.

Bankruptcy 

Around March 7, 2001, The Wall Street Journal reported that KB Toys acquired the bulk of eToys' remaining assets for $5 million. Bain Capital owns KB Toys. The law firm Traub, Bonacquist & Fox represented the creditors in the Chapter 11 bankruptcy proceedings. Paul Traub, a partner in the firm, had shortly before formed a company called Asset Disposition Advisors, LLC with Barry Gold. This relationship became controversial when Gold was appointed CEO of eToys. Some complained there was a conflict of interest, though a judge later found no fault.

Subsequent ownership
Nearly all the eToys assets were acquired by KB Toys in two separate bankruptcy auctions, then later sold to D. E. Shaw, a New York-based hedge fund. The eToys.com website was eventually reopened by eToys Direct Inc., a descendant of Internet startup and KB Toys partner Brainplay.com, and a subsidiary of Parent Company. It continued to market toys by mail order under the eToys name through both the website and printed catalogs. Parent Company and nine of its subsidiaries including eToys Direct filed for Chapter 11 bankruptcy on December 22, 2008. eToys.com was acquired by Toys "R" Us in February 2009.

References

External links
eToys.com

Toys "R" Us
American companies established in 1997
Retail companies established in 1997
Internet properties established in 1997
Retail companies disestablished in 2009
Internet properties disestablished in 2009
Toy retailers of the United States
Online retailers of the United States
Defunct online companies of the United States
Companies that filed for Chapter 11 bankruptcy in 2001
Dot-com bubble
1999 initial public offerings